Baranov (masculine) or Baranova (feminine) is a common Russian surname. It is derived from the sobriquet "баран" (argali, lamb). Notable people with the surname include:

Alexander Andreyevich Baranov (1747–1819), first governor of Russian Alaska
Alexander Ivanovich Baranov (born 1946), Russian Army Colonel General
Alyaksandr Baranaw (born 1974), Belarusian footballer
Anastasia Baranova (born 1989), Russian American actress
Elena Baranova (born 1972), Kyrgyzstan-born professional basketball player in America
Fedor I. Baranov (1886–1965), Russian fisheries scientist
Konstantin Baranov (born 1982), Russian ice hockey player
Lyubov Baranova (1929–2015), Soviet cross-country skier
Matwai Baranov (born 1965), Israeli Olympic wrestler
Natalya Baranova-Masalkina (born 1975), Russian cross-country skier
Nikita Baranov (born 1992), Estonian footballer
Nikolay Baranov (born 1960), Soviet sprint canoer
Nikolay Ilyich Baranov (1887–1981), Russian entomologist
Oleksandr Baranov (born 1960), Soviet and Ukrainian football player and coach
Sergei Baranov (figure skater) (born 1983), Ukrainian ice dancer
Sergei Baranov (volleyball) (born 1981), Russian volleyball player
Valery Baranov (politician) (born 1957), Ukrainian politician
Valery Baranov (soldier) (born 1948), Russian colonel general
Veera Baranova (born 1984), Estonian triple jumper
Victoria Baranova (born 1990), Russian track cyclist
Viktor Baranov (disambiguation), multiple people
Vitaliy Baranov (born 1975), Ukrainian ice dancer
Vladimir Baranov-Rossine (1888–1944), Russian avant-garde artist
Yevgeni Zakharovich Baranov (1869–1934), Russian historian, see :ru:Баранов, Евгений Захарович

See also
Baranovka (disambiguation)
Baranowski
Tatiana Baganova, Russian dance choreographer

Russian-language surnames

de:Baranow